Nenavath Balu Naik is an Indian politician and former M.L.A from Telangana. He represented the Devarakonda assembly constituency. He belongs to Scheduled Tribe, Lamabadi community.

He was elected to AP Legislative Assembly in 2009.

References

Andhra Pradesh MLAs 2009–2014
Indian National Congress politicians from Telangana
Living people
People from Medak
Indian National Congress politicians from Andhra Pradesh
Year of birth missing (living people)